Abdoul Coulibaly is a Côte d'Ivoire footballer. He Graduated from Ramkhamhaeng University in 2013. He is the current head coach of Thai club Nonthaburi United in the Thai League 3 Bangkok metropolitan region.

References
http://www.mtufc.com/board/index.php?topic=4091.0 
http://www.fif-ci.com/plays-details.php?playerID=476&clubID=24&compTyp=98
https://www.youtube.com/watch?v=jADqrpybKP0

1987 births
Living people
Ivorian footballers
Abdoul Coulibaly
Expatriate footballers in Thailand
Association football midfielders